The Body Said No! is a 1950 British crime comedy film directed by Val Guest and starring Michael Rennie, Yolande Donlan, and Hy Hazell. It was shot at Walton Studios near London and distributed by Eros Films.

Premise
In a British TV studio, Michael Rennie (as himself) is performing live in a dramatic broadcast. On a neighbouring set, cabaret singer Mikki Brent thinks she sees a coded plot being discussed to murder Rennie. Her friends are sceptical, but she warns Rennie, and various adventures and investigations ensue.

Cast
 Michael Rennie as The Body
 Yolande Donlan as Mikki Brent
 Hy Hazell as Sue
 Jon Pertwee as Watchman
 Valentine Dyall as John Sutherland
 Reginald Beckwith as Benton
 Arthur Hill as Robin King
 Cyril Smith as Sergeant
 Jack Billings as Eddie
 Peter Butterworth as Driver
 Maggie Rennie as Mrs Rennie
 Joyce Heron as Journalist
 Winifred Shotter as TV Announcer
 Eddie Vitch as Diner
 Ivan Craig as Derek
 Barry O'Neill as Constable
 Jack Faint as Anton
 Sam Kydd as Sam

Critical reception
TV Guide wrote, "an early inside glimpse of the television world, but a paranoid no-brainer."

References

Bibliography
 Harper, Sue & Porter, Vincent. British Cinema of the 1950s: The Decline of Deference. Oxford University Press, 2007.

External links

1950 films
1950s crime comedy films
1950s English-language films
Films directed by Val Guest
British crime comedy films
1950 comedy films
British black-and-white films
Films shot at Nettlefold Studios
1950s British films